Bashir Ahmad Bilour (1 August 1943 – 22 December 2012) was a member of the provincial assembly of Khyber-Pakhtunkhwa and Senior Minister for Local Government and Rural Development of Khyber-Pakhtunkhwa.

Early life and education
Bashir Ahmad Bilour was born on 1 August 1943 in the Khyber Pakhtunkhwa of Pakistan. He belongs to a prominent political and social Kakazai family of Peshawar.

Bilour had a bachelor's degree in law. He was a member of Peshawar High Court Bar as a lawyer and took part in the active politics from the platform of Awami National Party since 1970.

Political life
In the 2008 elections, Bashir Bilour was elected as a member of the provincial assembly of Khyber-Pakhtunkhwa with majority of the votes, (over 4000) from PF-3, a constituency of Peshawar City. He remained MPA for 5 consecutive times. He was the parliamentary leader and was the only MPA of ANP even after the MMA wave when Ghulam Ahmad Bilour and many others lost.

Death and funeral

On 22 December 2012, Bilour was leaving after attending a meeting of ANP workers at a private residence in Peshawar, when he was attacked and critically injured by a suicide bomber at 6:15 pm. He was taken to Lady Reading Hospital where he died at 7:40 pm. His secretary, Noor Muhammad, was also killed in the blast. This was the 5th attack on him and, as was usual for Bilour, he had no guards with him. The funeral prayer for him was held at Colonel Sher Khan Army Stadium on 23 December 2012 with at least 20,000 people despite threats. The city was closed as he was buried at Syed Hasan Pir graveyard in Peshawar.

References

1943 births
2012 deaths
Hindkowan people
Awami National Party politicians
Assassinated Pakistani politicians
People from Peshawar
Insurgency in Khyber Pakhtunkhwa casualties
Khyber Pakhtunkhwa MPAs 2008–2013